Esenkent can refer to:

 Esenkent, Elâzığ
 Esenkent (Istanbul Metro)